Lõrinc Jankovich (8 October 1907 – 14 September 1990) was a Hungarian equestrian. He competed in two events at the 1936 Summer Olympics.

References

External links
 

1907 births
1990 deaths
Hungarian male equestrians
Olympic equestrians of Hungary
Equestrians at the 1936 Summer Olympics
Sportspeople from Békés County